Simion Mironaș (19 November 1965 – 7 May 2022) was a Romanian professional footballer who played as a defender.

Career
In the 8th round of the 1994–95 Divizia A season Simion played on 13 October 1994 for Gloria Bistrița against Rapid București and on 15 October for Dinamo București against Universitatea Cluj, thus becoming the only Romanian that played for two teams in the same round.

Conviction
On 28 February 1998, Mironaș was involved in a road accident while driving his car in Susenii Bârgăului, Bistrița-Năsăud County and hit two teenagers, one of them who was 15 years old died. He was driving without a license after a few days earlier he hit a pregnant woman on the crosswalk. Mironaș received a one-year suspended sentence.

Honours
Gloria Bistrița
Cupa României: 1993–94

References

External links

1965 births
2022 deaths
Romanian footballers
Association football defenders
Liga I players
Liga II players
CSM Suceava players
FC Argeș Pitești players
ACF Gloria Bistrița players
Békéscsaba 1912 Előre footballers
FC Dinamo București players
FC Rapid București players
FC Unirea Dej players
FC Olimpia Satu Mare players
CS Corvinul Hunedoara players
People from Neamț County
Romanian expatriate footballers
Romanian expatriate sportspeople in Hungary
Expatriate footballers in Hungary